Phyllomacromia contumax, the two-banded cruiser, is a species of dragonfly in the family Corduliidae that lives in sub-Saharan Africa. Its natural habitats are woodlands, gallery forests, rivers, and lakes in subtropical or tropical savanna.

References

Corduliidae
Insects described in 1879
Odonata of Africa